GRG Matriculation Higher Secondary School (GRG MHSS) is a LKG–XII, co-educational private school on Avinashi Road in Peelamedu, Coimbatore, Tamil Nadu, India. It was established in 1969 and is part of the GRG Trust.

References

External links 
 

Schools in Coimbatore
Private schools in Tamil Nadu
Primary schools in Tamil Nadu
High schools and secondary schools in Tamil Nadu
Educational institutions established in 1969
1969 establishments in Tamil Nadu